Marcos Gerard (born 15 April 1950) is a Mexican sailor. He competed in the Star event at the 1968 Summer Olympics.

References

External links
 

1950 births
Living people
Mexican male sailors (sport)
Olympic sailors of Mexico
Sailors at the 1968 Summer Olympics – Star
Sportspeople from Mexico City
20th-century Mexican people